Witse Meeussen (born 8 March 2001) is a Belgian cyclo-cross and road cyclist, who currently rides for UCI Continental team . In 2019, he won the silver medal in the junior race at the 2019 UCI Cyclo-cross World Championships in Bogense, Denmark.

Personal life
Meeussen is currently studying Sports and Movement Sciences at KU Leuven.

Major results

Ciclocross
2017–2018
 2nd National Junior Championships
 Junior Soudal Classics
2nd Neerpelt
 Junior DVV Trophy
3rd Lille
 3rd Junior Oostmalle
2018–2019
 1st  Overall UCI Junior World Cup
1st Bern
1st Tábor
1st Hoogerheide
2nd Koksijde
2nd Pontchâteau
3rd Namur
 1st Overall Junior Superprestige
1st Gieten
1st Ruddervoorde
1st Diegem
1st Middelkerke
2nd Gavere
3rd Hoogstraten
 Junior Brico Cross
1st Ronse
2nd Geraardsbergen
 1st Junior Oostmalle
 1st Junior Wachtebeke
 Junior DVV Trophy
2nd Brussels
2nd Lille
 2nd  UCI World Junior Championships
 2nd  UEC European Junior Championships
 2nd National Junior Championships
2022–2023
 1st  National Under-23 Championships
 National Trophy Series
1st Derby
 2nd Mechelen
 3rd Overall UCI Under-23 World Cup
2nd Zonhoven
2nd Besançon
3rd Maasmechelen
 Under-23 X²O Badkamers Trophy
2nd Kortrijk
2nd Brussels
3rd Koksijde
 3rd Oisterwijk
 3rd  UCI World Under-23 Championships
 3rd  UEC European Under-23 Championships

Strada
2019
 4th Grand Prix Bob Jungels

References

External links

Witse Meeussen at Cyclocross 24

2001 births
Living people
Belgian male cyclists
Place of birth missing (living people)
Cyclo-cross cyclists
People from Duffel
Cyclists from Antwerp Province